Gerasimos I, (? – 19 April 1321) was the Ecumenical Patriarch of Constantinople from 1320 to 1321.

He was born in Philadelphia and became abbot of the prestigious Mangana Monastery in Constantinople. He was elected as patriarch 
at an advanced age, and died on 19 April 1321.

1321 deaths
14th-century patriarchs of Constantinople
13th-century births